The Women's slalom competition of the 1960 Winter Olympics at Squaw Valley was held on Friday, February 26, and was the final alpine event of the games.

The defending world champion was Inger Bjørnbakken of Norway,
who finished 14th. Anne Heggtveit of Canada won by over three seconds after gaining a large lead after the first run. She also won the combined, a world championship title.

Results

Source:

References 

Women's slalom
Oly
Alp